David Möller (also spelled Moeller, born 13 January 1982) is a German former luger who competed from 2001 to 2014. He won six medals at the FIL World Luge Championships with four golds (Men's singles: 2004, 2007; Mixed team: 2004, 2007), one silver (Men's singles: 2008), and one bronze (Men's singles: 2005)

Möller also won four medals at the FIL European Luge Championships with one gold (Mixed team: 2006), one silver (Men's singles: 2004), and two bronzes (Men's singles: 2006, 2008).

He also finished fifth in the men's singles event at the 2006 Winter Olympics in Torino and won the silver medal at the 2010 Winter Olympics in Vancouver .

Möller's best Luge World Cup overall finish was second three times (2005-6, 2006-7, 2007-8).

On 18 January 2009, Möller suffered a cruciate ligament rupture while training in Oberhof. He underwent surgery for the rupture in Munich at the end of February. Möller underwent physical rehabilitation in early 2009 to prepare for the 2009-10 Luge World Cup and Winter Olympics in Vancouver to which he qualified.

After he competed at the 2014 Winter Olympics in Sochi, his third Games, he announced his retirement from competition.

Outside of luge, he works for the German Federal Police.

References

External links 

 
 
 
 

1982 births
Living people
German male lugers
Olympic lugers of Germany
Olympic silver medalists for Germany
Olympic medalists in luge
Lugers at the 2006 Winter Olympics
Lugers at the 2010 Winter Olympics
Lugers at the 2014 Winter Olympics
Medalists at the 2010 Winter Olympics
People from Sonneberg
People from Bezirk Suhl
Sportspeople from Thuringia